Barrington ("Barry") Watson (born 13 February 1944) is a former Great British Olympian and long-distance runner. He came 45th in the marathon in the 1976 Summer Olympics. In 1977, he came second behind Steve Ovett in the first Dartford half marathon.

In 2005, he helped to establish the Somme Poppy Marathon. He was born in Poole, Dorset, England.

International competitions

References

1944 births
Living people
Sportspeople from Poole
Footballers from Dorset
English male marathon runners
Olympic athletes of Great Britain
Athletes (track and field) at the 1976 Summer Olympics